Robert Leslie Graham  (14 September 1911 – 12 June 1953) was a British motorcycle road racer who competed in the 1930s and 1940s. He won the inaugural Grand Prix motorcycle racing 500 cc World Championship in 1949.

Early Career (1929–1939)
Les Graham started racing at Liverpool's Stanley Speedway on dirt. In 1929 he entered a race on the Oswestry Park Hall circuit, riding a second hand Dot-JAP, and came second to Henry Pinnington on an AJS. For the next few years he raced a succession of Rudge hybrids with varying success.

In 1936 he managed to purchase a near new 250 cc OHC OK-Supreme cheaply, because it had dropped a valve. He rebuilt it, and entered it in the 1936 Ulster Grand Prix. After completing a lap of the Clady Circuit, the big end seized. He rebuilt it for 1937, and entered Northern Ireland's North West 200, and lead the Lightweights for a while until he came off. He remounted, joined the field, and was running third behind a couple of Excelsiors, when the valve gear broke. He rebuilt the engine again, and won his next race at Donington Park. He then entered the Ulster Grand Prix, and came fourth.

After this he was approached by John Humphries (the son of OK-Supreme's founder) to join the firm, and was given a job assembling the OHC engines. OK-Supreme produced short track racers with JAP engines. Les Graham, Andy McKay, and John Humphries soon became known as the Midlands trio of OK-JAP riders. In summer of 1938 they raced in the South Eastern Championships on Layhams Farm "mountain mile" grass track. Les took the 20 lap Matchless Trophy, setting a record in the process, despite never having competed on that track before.

He came 12th in the 1938 Isle of Man TT Lightweight on an OK-Supreme. In 1939 he entered the IOM TT riding a Rudge engine Chris Tattersal St. Annes (CTS), and was running fourth on the second last lap, when the gearbox broke. Jock West was watching the race, and signed Les up to ride a Velo in 1940, but the War intervened, and that did not happen.

World War II
Graham served as a pilot in the RAF during World War II. He was assigned to the 166 Squadron from 1940, flying Lancaster bombers over Germany. He attained the rank of Flight Lieutenant and was awarded the Distinguished Flying Cross in December 1944 for bravery. Afterwards, he flew with Transport Command, until he was demobilised in 1946.

He had an invitation from Wing Commander J.M. ("Jock") West, OBE, to join sales and competition at Associated Motorcycles (AMC).

Post War Career (1946–1953)
Afterwards, he returned to racing in the late 1940s as a member of the AJS factory racing team. He competed privately at the first post war Cadwell Park meeting, on a Norton 350, and won. In 1947, on an AJS Porcupine, he managed 9th place in the Senior Isle of Man TT In 1948 he managed a seventh in the Junior, but did not finish in the Senior. That year at Montlhery, Jock West, Les Graham, and French rider Georges Monneret broke 18 world records at speeds between 107 and 111 mph.

The Motorcycle World Championships were first held in 1949, a year before the beginning of the four-wheeler Formula One World Championship. Les was the first winner of the prestigious 500 cc class, riding an AJS Porcupine. The Championship began with Graham leading by 90 seconds in the 1st round, at the 1949 Isle of Man TT. With only a few miles to go, the magneto drive sheared and he pushed home to finish 9th. He won round 2 at Bremgarten in Switzerland and set fastest lap (in year 1 fastest laps counted for 1 point). Round 3 was the Dutch TT where he finished 2nd to Nello Pagani. He failed to finish in round 4 at Spa in Belgium. Round 5 was the Ulster Grand Prix in which he was victorious and collected the fastest lap. The final round was held at Monza in Italy where local hero Nello Pagani on a Gilera won. A rider's best three finishes counted. Graham had 2 wins & a second, Pagani had 2 wins & a 3rd. Graham took the title even though Pagani's overall score was higher.

In 1950, Graham finished 3rd behind Italian Umberto Masetti (Gilera) and new star Geoff Duke (Norton) of England. He also competed in the 1950 International Six Days Trial held in Wales on an AJS 350. In 1951, Count Domenico Agusta approached Graham to ride for MV Agusta. Frustrated by a lack of development with the AJS, he joined the Italian team to ride and develop their 500 cc four-cylinder machines. Graham failed to score points for MV in the 500 cc class. While the MVs were very powerful, the handling was not as well sorted, and the bikes were considered a "handful". Agusta were not competing in the 350 cc class, so Graham rode a Velocette MkVIII KTT 350 in competition, finishing 6th in class and winning the Swiss Grand Prix. He also finished 8th in the 125 cc class in 1951

For 1952, Graham began with no points in round 1 in Switzerland, 2nd in the Isle of Man TT though a missed gear change and subsequent loss of power undoubtedly robbed him of a win. Reg Armstrong (Ireland), riding a factory Norton took victory, a very lucky one with Armstrong's chain breaking as he crossed the finish line, with Les Graham 33.4 seconds behind. He failed to score points in the Dutch TT or the Belgian GP. He finished 4th with the fastest lap at Solitude in West Germany. He suffered another non-finish but fastest lap in the Ulster (Tyre tread problems with his Dunlops). He followed this with MV Agusta's first ever 500 cc win plus the fastest lap in front of an enthusiastic Italian crowd at Monza. This was followed by a second win in Spain. He finished the season second to Gilera's Umberto Masetti in the championship. In the 250 cc class, he finished 3rd using Velocette and Benelli machines and claimed 4th in the 125 cc class for MV Agusta.

For 1953, Graham was the pre-season favorite and tipped to win the championship again. Alas, this was not to be. On the Thursday, he finally won an Isle of Man TT, winning the Lightweight 125 cc class for MV. In the Friday's Senior TT, he lost control of his bike at high speed, as he took the rise after the bottom of Bray Hill, and was killed instantly. Carlo Bandirola and the rest of the MV racing team withdrew from the Championship that year as a mark of respect. The commemorative Graham Memorial shelter was built on the Snaefell mountain road in 1955.

Motorcycle Grand Prix results 
1949 point system

Points system from 1950 to 1968

5 best results were counted until 1955.

(key) (Races in italics indicate fastest lap)

Sources

External links
 TT database rider profile TT Competitor profile iomtt.com
 TT database TT results Full TT results at iomtt.com
 Leslie Graham career profile at Motorsport Memorial 

People from Wallasey
British motorcycle racers
English motorcycle racers
500cc World Championship riders
350cc World Championship riders
250cc World Championship riders
125cc World Championship riders
Isle of Man TT riders
Enduro riders
Recipients of the Distinguished Flying Cross (United Kingdom)
Motorcycle racers who died while racing
1911 births
1953 deaths
Sport deaths in the Isle of Man
Place of birth missing
Royal Air Force pilots of World War II
Royal Air Force officers
500cc World Riders' Champions